Palazu may refer to one of two villages in Constanța County, Romania:

Palazu Mare, a village in Constanța city
Palazu Mic, a village in Mihail Kogălniceanu Commune